Thomas & Friends: Journey Beyond Sodor is a 2017 British computer-animated musical adventure film and feature-length special based on the British television series Thomas & Friends, based on The Railway Series by Wilbert Awdry. This is the first Thomas film to be produced by Mattel Creations and animated by Jam Filled Toronto. It was released on 22 August 2017 in the US and on 16 October  2017 in the UK.

The film stars the voices of Joseph May in the US and John Hasler in the UK voice of Thomas the Tank Engine. It also stars the voices of Rob Rackstraw,
Christopher Ragland, Nigel Pilkington, Keith Wickham, Kerry Shale and Teresa Gallagher with Mark Moraghan narrating his last special. Hugh Bonneville, Lucy Montgomery, Darren Boyd, Jim Howick, Sophie Colquhoun, Colin McFarlane and Nicola Stapleton join the cast. This special deals with many traits that children have such as autism, through the Experimental Engines.

Following Journey Beyond Sodor, season 22 of Thomas & Friends and Big World! Big Adventures! followed Thomas going on adventures around the world.

Plot 
On his way to deliver a goods train to Bridlington on the Mainland, Henry suffers an accident due to a faulty signal and has to be taken to the Steamworks for repairs. Thomas is upset that Sir Topham Hatt chooses James, who believes he’s Sir Topham Hatt’s favorite Engine, to take the train in Henry's place. Thomas collects the goods train before James does so he can take it to Bridlington himself. However, the Troublesome Trucks disorient him and he goes the wrong way. 

Thomas later finds himself at a massive Steelworks factory run by Hurricane and Frankie who invite him to stay. Thomas initially declines but the Steelworks engines eventually persuade him as it is already very late. The next morning, Thomas learns that Hurricane delivered his train to Bridlington during the night and Frankie convinces him to help out at the Steelworks as to return the favor. However, they refuse to let Thomas leave and continue to force him to work for him, but Thomas escapes during the night.

Meanwhile, back on Sodor, Sir Topham Hatt gets worried that the goods have been delayed later than its expected time and gets more worried about Thomas. He later tells Percy not to worry and that Thomas has been delayed and James tries hard to convince Sir Topham Hatt for him to go to the Mainland to save Thomas, which Sir Topham Hatt refuses James to go to the Mainland and says that he can't afford to lose another train, leaving James temporarily in charge of Thomas's Branch lines. Percy suggests James go to the mainland himself to find Thomas. Searching for him at Bridlington goods yard, the trucks from the goods train tell him they were brought by Hurricane. James asks if anyone has seen Hurricane. 

The next day, Thomas asks three experimental engines: Lexi and Theo, who helped him get more coal and water earlier, and Merlin, who Lexi and Theo told him about, if they can help him get back to Sodor, but are unable to. So Thomas continues his journey home, and meets Beresford again, a crane whom he previously met after he got lost, and sees that Hurricane and Frankie are taking James to the Steelworks. Thomas enlists the help of the experimental engines to rescue James from being captured too. Theo and Lexi distract the Steelworks engines while Thomas and Merlin try to help James escape. The plan quickly goes downhill, a wild chase ensues in the Steelworks, James is saved but Thomas is put in harm's way when he almost gets melted by molten slag. Hurricane selflessly pushes him out of the way causing his wheels to melt as a result. Frankie claims that Hurricane will not be able to help her make deliveries and explains that they are overworked at the Steelworks, which is why they tried to enslave Thomas and James, and that either nobody wants to work at the factory or just too busy. Thomas suggests that the experimental engines help them out. Although they are sure they are incapable of doing it, they are happy to try. 

On their way back to Sodor, Thomas and James apologize to each other. Thomas explains to James that being friends is more important than being the favorite and they return home. Henry returns and asks what he missed in his absence.

Voice cast

Reception 
Common Sense Media gave it 3/5 stars, calling it a “Suspenseful adventure,” that had “positive messages, and the addition of some spirited new characters who add fun to the tale.” They however noted it being darker than other Thomas films.

References

External links
 
 

2010s children's animated films
2017 computer-animated films
2017 films
British computer-animated films
Films set in Cumbria
Mattel Creations films
Universal Pictures direct-to-video animated films
Universal Pictures direct-to-video films
Universal Pictures animated films
Thomas & Friends
2010s English-language films
2010s American films
2010s British films